Vigga is a local Norwegian newspaper published in Dombås in Oppland county.

The is a regional newspaper, mainly covering events in the municipalities of Lesja and Dovre. Until 2012 it also had an office in Otta in oder to cover a wider area including Sel and the municipalities along Ottadalen. Vigga was established in 1987 by the married couple Marit and Asbjørn Amble.

The name originates in the local term "vigga", referring to the zone where the trees can no longer grow, where the forest end and the landscape transitions into more barren steppe or tundra like conditions typical for the mountainous areas of the region.

Circulation
According to the Norwegian Audit Bureau of Circulations and National Association of Local Newspapers, Vigga has had the following annual circulation:
 2006: 2,465
 2007: 2,629
 2008: 2,414
 2009: 2,293
 2010: 2,421
 2011: 2,283
 2012: 2,265
 2013: 2,242
 2014: 2,189
 2015: 2,186
 2016: 2,120

References

External links
Vigga homepage

Newspapers published in Norway
Norwegian-language newspapers
Dombås
Mass media in Oppland
Publications established in 1987
1987 establishments in Norway